Jeroen Houwen (born 18 February 1996) is a Dutch professional footballer who plays as a goalkeeper for Vitesse.

Club career

Vitesse
Houwen joined Vitesse in 2012 and quickly progressed to the first-team squad, appearing as a substitute throughout the 2014–15 campaign. On 19 November 2017, Houwen finally made his Vitesse debut in their 4–2 away defeat against Groningen.

On 27 August 2018, Houwen agreed to join Eerste Divisie side, Telstar on a season-long loan.

Career statistics

References

External links 
 

1996 births
Living people
People from Venray
Association football goalkeepers
Dutch footballers
Eredivisie players
Eerste Divisie players
SBV Vitesse players
SC Telstar players
Go Ahead Eagles players
Netherlands youth international footballers
Footballers from Limburg (Netherlands)